4TV News and Entertainment Channel is an Urdu 24/7 News television channel, owned by 4TV Network. The channel is a free-to-air and launched on 18 April 2013. The channel is available across all major cable and DTH platforms as well as online. The channel is India's first celebrity-driven TV Commerce channel. The channel is indias first celebrity teleshopping network.

References

http://www.thehindu.com/news/cities/Hyderabad/ou-police-seize-two-hard-discs-from-4tv-channel-office/article4325670.ece

http://www.thehindu.com/news/cities/Hyderabad/watch-this-old-city-channels-prove-a-hit/article4277183.ece

https://www.lyngsat.com/tvchannels/in/4TV.html

http://www.ndtv.com/south/hyderabad-court-hears-plea-against-mim-leader-akbaruddin-owaisi-for-alleged-hate-speech-509183

http://www.ndtv.com/south/court-notice-to-youtube-facebook-over-andhra-pradesh-legislator-akbaruddin-owaisis-speech-559012

http://www.siasat.com/news/4tv-videographer-admits-video-recording-attack-akbar-owaisi-1132161/

Urdu-language television channels in India
Television channels and stations established in 2010
Television stations in Hyderabad